Grand Theft Auto is an action-adventure video game developed by DMA Design and published by BMG Interactive. It is the first title of the Grand Theft Auto series and was released in November 1997 for MS-DOS and Microsoft Windows, in December 1997 for the PlayStation and in October 1999 for the Game Boy Color. The game's narrative follows a criminal who climbs in status within the criminal underworld across three fictional cities, inspired by real-life locations. The gameplay is presented from a top-down perspective and takes place within an open-world environment in which the player is not required to perform missions, although they are necessary to progress through the levels.

Grand Theft Auto began development as a game titled Race 'n' Chase, in which the player controlled a police officer pursuing criminals. However, the game was considered dull, and the concept of playing as a criminal was adopted. The development team worked to ensure that the player would have the freedom to play however they intend. Grand Theft Auto created a great deal of controversy even before its launch due to its violent content, with discussions taking place in the British House of Lords about banning its sale. The game's marketing campaign, organised by publicist Max Clifford, exploited this stirring of controversy as free promotion.

Grand Theft Auto was met with mixed reviews upon release, but was a commercial success. While the graphics and controls were criticised, the entertainment value, sound design and freedom of the gameplay were praised. Over time, it has been recognised as one of the greatest video games. Two expansions taking place in 1960s England, Grand Theft Auto: London 1969 and Grand Theft Auto: London 1961, were launched in 1999. The success of Grand Theft Auto spawned a series of games which built upon the original's gameplay and themes; the Grand Theft Auto series has since become one of the most popular and best-selling video game franchises of all time. The first sequel in the series, Grand Theft Auto 2, was released in October 1999.

Gameplay 

Grand Theft Auto is made up of six levels split between three main cities; each locale is based on a real-life city in the United States, with an alternative name: Liberty City (New York City), San Andreas (San Francisco), and Vice City (Miami). The progression is linear, as each level completed automatically unlocks the next one in the chain. Players begin a game choosing a character from among eight—four in the PlayStation version—and naming them, though the choice is purely aesthetic, and does not affect the overall gameplay. In each level, the player's ultimate objective is to reach a target number of points, which starts at $1,000,000 but becomes higher in the later levels, and then reach the level's "goal" to complete the stage. The player is free to do whatever they want, but have limited lives upon doing so. Points can be gained from anything, such as causing death and destruction amid the traffic in the city, completing special challenges, or stealing and selling cars for profit. However, the more typical means to achieve their target is to perform tasks for the level's local crime syndicate. Jobs can be initiated by visiting and touching a ringing telephone box, with each level's set of jobs on offer being unique.

Jobs can be completed in any order, and each has some level of freedom to how it is successfully completed, though destinations in each are fixed. Successful completion of a job awards the player points, unlocks harder missions with greater rewards, and provides a "multiplier"—a bonus that increases the value of points earned from completing jobs and actions. Failing a job by not completing objectives, being arrested or dying, secures no points and can seal off other tasks in the chain. Players can find equipment across the level's map to help them with jobs and making points, including weapons and body armour, the latter increasing the player's survival against attacks from enemies. If the player is killed (referred to in the game as "Wasted"), they lose a life, lose all their current equipment, and have their multiplier bonus reset; losing all their lives will result in players having to restart a level. Law enforcement is present in each level, and doing criminal actions will cause the player to raise their notoriety with police; the higher the level, the tougher the response. If the player is arrested, they forfeit all equipment, and have their multiplier bonus halved.

PC versions of the game were released with networked multiplayer gameplay using the IPX protocol.

Development 

The development of Grand Theft Auto began on 4 April 1995 at DMA Design in Dundee. It originally had a protracted four-year development, which included a title change and numerous attempts to halt development.

The game was originally titled Race'n'Chase. It was originally planned to be released on MS-DOS, Windows 95, PlayStation, Sega Saturn and the Nintendo 64. However, it was never released for the two latter consoles. During the development of Grand Theft Auto, many people overseeing the game's progress attempted to halt the development, which led the crew at DMA Design to have to convince them to allow them to continue.

There were specific milestones planned for Grand Theft Auto, none of which were met:
 Development begins: 4 April 1995
 Complete game design: 31 May 1995
 Engine: 3 July 1995
 Look and feel: 2 October 1995
 First play: 3 January 1996
 Alpha: 1 April 1996
 End of production: 1 July 1996

An original design document, dated 22 March 1995, was posted online by Mike Dailly on 22 March 2011. The credited author of the document is K.R. Hamilton, and the released version is 1.05. It contained information about elements of the game discussed in various meetings held from 23 January 1995 to the writing of the document.

According to the original design document, the introduction to Grand Theft Auto is a pre-drawn/rendered animation. The Windows 95 version was developed using Visual C++ v2.0. The DOS version was developed using Watcom C/C++ v10, Microsoft MASM 6.1 and Rational Systems DOS extender (DOS4GW) v 1.97. The program used to make Grand Theft Auto was said to produce "a 3D array which can [be] used by both the perspective and the isometric engines". It was said to consist of "a grid editor which is used to place blocks on a grid, with a [separate] grid for each level", and "allow any block to be placed at any level". It was said that the world may have had to be 256×256×6 blocks.

The original concept of Grand Theft Auto was "to produce a fun, addictive and fast multi-player car racing and crashing game which uses a novel graphics method".

David Jones, the game's producer, cited Pac-Man as an influence. He noted that the player runs over pedestrians and gets chased by police in a similar manner to Pac-Man.

Gary Penn, creative director of DMA at the time, cited Elite as a major influence, "But I'd been working on Frontier, which is very different and there were definitely other people on the team who had things like Syndicate, Mercenary and Elite very much in their minds as well. That combination definitely led to the more open plan structure there is now. The game as it stands now is basically Elite in a city, but without quite the same sense of taking on the jobs. You take on the jobs in a slightly different way, but incredibly similar structurally. It's just a much more acceptable real world setting. The game was cops and robbers and then that evolved fairly quickly—nobody wants to be the cop, it's more fun to be bad. And then that evolved into Grand Theft Auto".

In an early 1997 interview, project leader Keith Hamilton commented, "GTA was harder than we thought. We're rewriting the handling of the cars at the moment. We've got the time as we're changing the graphics to 24-bit."

Ports 
The original Grand Theft Auto was developed for MS-DOS, but then later ported to Microsoft Windows (using SciTech MGL), PlayStation (developed by Visual Sciences using their "ViSOS" framework), and Game Boy Color. The Game Boy Color version was technologically unabridged, which was quite a technical achievement due to the sheer size of the cities, converted tile-for-tile from the PC original, making them many times larger than most Game Boy Color game worlds were because of the handheld's limited hardware. To cater for the target younger generation, however, the game was heavily censored, with gore and swearing removed.

The PC version comes in several different executables for DOS and MS-Windows, which use a single set of data files (except for the 8-bit colour DOS version which uses different but similar graphics). It was previously available as a free download as part of the Rockstar Classics (alongside Wild Metal and Grand Theft Auto 2), however the free download service is currently unavailable.

Grand Theft Auto was to be released on the Sega Saturn, but due to the console's rapid decline in popularity before development was finished, the project was halted and the game was never released. After the PlayStation's successful release, development began on Grand Theft Auto 64, a port of the game for the Nintendo 64, rumoured to have graphical enhancements and new missions. However, development was cancelled without ever having a public appearance.

Cover art 
The cover art for Grand Theft Auto is a photograph of a New York Police Department 1980s Plymouth Gran Fury rushing through the intersection of Fifth Avenue and 56th Street, with Trump Tower in the background of the picture. The same cover art was also an alternative cover for Grand Theft Auto 2 in selected markets.
There was also a cover featuring a yellow Buick GSX. There are other covers, but the one shown above is the most common.

Soundtrack 
The freedom of the game's world led the DMA team to believe that gamers would like to listen to different music while driving around the city, and so came up with the idea of several radio stations that would play music from various genres. Three DMA members – Colin Anderson, Craig Conner, and Grant Middleton – composed the radio tracks and recorded them at night in the company's offices. Grand Theft Auto features seven radio stations and a police band track. All can be heard when the player enters a vehicle; however, each vehicle only receives a limited number of stations. Players can remove the game's CD when it has finished loading and replace it with another one with their own music. When the character enters a car, the game randomly plays music from the CD. The game's main theme was composed by Conner and credited to the fictional band Da Shootaz. With the exception of Head Radio, the names of songs and radio stations are never mentioned within the game.

Reception 

The game was a best-seller in the UK. By November 1998, global shipments to retailers of Grand Theft Auto computer and PlayStation versions had surpassed 1 million units combined. At the 1999 Milia festival in Cannes, it took home a "Gold" prize for revenues above €17 million in the European Union during 1998. The game was a commercial success, though it received mixed reviews upon release.

GameSpot 1998 review for Grand Theft Auto said that, although the graphics may look "a little plain", the music and sound effects are the opposite, praising the radio stations and the sound effects used to open and close vehicles. They also praised the freedom of the game, favouring it over other games that make the player follow a specific rule set and complete specific missions in a specific order.

IGN were critical of the graphics which were said to be "really quite shoddy" and dated. They were also unimpressed by the "fast-food programming and careless design", including the controls. Overall the game was considered to be fun but with problems which could have been fixed.

Next Generation reviewed the PC version of the game, rating it four stars out of five, and stated that "It is quite easy to accuse Grand Theft Auto of being all style and no substance, but the charge doesn't stick. Of course, we don't condone the acts within, but there is no denying that the game itself is well-executed and quite enjoyable."

Legacy 

Grand Theft Auto has been recognised as one of the greatest video games by several publications.

References

Notes

Citations

Bibliography

External links 

 
 Race'n'Chase design document dated 22 March 1995
 Original Grand Theft Auto prototypes on Mike Dailly's homepage
 

1997 video games
Action-adventure games
ASC Games games
BMG Interactive games
Cancelled Nintendo 64 games
Cancelled Sega Saturn games
Censored video games
Cultural depictions of the Mafia
DOS games
Freeware games
Game Boy Color games
Game engine recreations
Grand Theft Auto
Obscenity controversies in video games
Open-world video games
Organized crime video games
PlayStation (console) games
Rockstar Games games
Top-down video games
Video games developed in the United Kingdom
Video games featuring female protagonists
Video games featuring protagonists of selectable gender
Video games set in 1997
Video games set in the United States
Video games with expansion packs
Windows games